Stefan Withalm (born  in Vienna) is an Austrian bobsledder.

Withalm competed at the 2014 Winter Olympics for Austria. He teamed with driver Benjamin Maier, Markus Sammer, Angel Somov and Sebastian Heufler in the four-man event, finishing 21st.

Withalm made his World Cup debut in December 2011. As of April 2014, his best finish is 7th, in a four-man event in 2011-12 at Konigssee.

References

1983 births
Living people
Olympic bobsledders of Austria
Sportspeople from Vienna
Bobsledders at the 2014 Winter Olympics
Austrian male bobsledders